Lissachatina fulica is a species of large land snail that belongs in the subfamily Achatininae of the family Achatinidae. It is also known as the Giant African land snail. It shares the common name "giant African snail" with other species of snails such as Achatina achatina and Archachatina marginata. This snail species has been considered a significant cause of pest issues around the world. Internationally, it is the most frequently occurring invasive species of snail.

Outside of its native range, this snail thrives in many types of habitat in areas with mild climates. It feeds voraciously and is a vector for plant pathogens, causing severe damage to agricultural crops and native plants. It competes with native snail taxa, is a nuisance pest of urban areas, and spreads human disease. This snail is listed as one of the top 100 invasive species in the world.

Subspecies 
Subspecies within this species:
 Lissachatina fulica castanea (Lamarck, 1822)
 Lissachatina fulica coloba (Pilsbry, 1904)
 Lissachatina fulica hamillei Petit, 1859
 L. f. rodatzi Dunker, 1852
 L. f. umbilicata Nevill, 1879

Distribution 
The species is native to East Africa, but it has been widely introduced to other parts of the world through the pet trade, as a food resource, and by accidental introduction.

This species has been found in China since 1931 and its initial point of distribution in China was Xiamen. The snail has also been established on Pratas Island, of Taiwan, throughout India, the Pacific, Indian Ocean islands, Southeast Asia and the West Indies. The species was established in the United States in 1936. They were brought to the U.S. through imports, intended for educational uses and to be pets. Some were also introduced because they were accidentally shipped with other cargo. An eradication effort in Florida began in 2011 when first sighted, and the last sighting was in 2017. In October 2021 the Florida Department of Agriculture declared the eradication a success after no further sightings in those four years. In June 2022 the snail was again found in Florida.

The species has been observed in Bhutan (Gyelposhing, Mongar), where it is an invasive species since 2006 and their number increased drastically since 2008. It has begun to attack agricultural fields and flower gardens. It is believed there that dogs have died as a result of consuming the snail and being infected by the rat lungworm, Angiostrongylus cantonensis and causes eosinophilic meningitis in humans.

Starting in 2010, individuals of the species have been found in the humid, subtropical Argentine Mesopotamia. The National Agricultural Health Service has established an ongoing project to detect, study, and prevent the expansion of this pest.

In early April 2021, USCBP intercepted 22 being smuggled from Ghana into the US, along with various other prohibited quarantine items.

Description 

The shell has a conical shape, being about twice as long as it is broad. Either clockwise (dextral) or counter-clockwise (sinistral) directions can be observed in the coiling of the shell, although the dextral cone is the more common. Shell colouration is highly variable, and dependent on diet. Typically, brown is the predominant colour and the shell is banded.

Ecology

Habitat 
The giant African snail is native to East Africa, and can be traced back to Kenya and Tanzania. It is a highly invasive species, and colonies can be formed from a single gravid individual. In many places, release into the wild is illegal. Nonetheless, the species has established itself in some temperate climates and its habitat now includes most regions of the humid tropics, including many Pacific islands, southern and eastern Asia, and the Caribbean. The giant snail can now be found in agricultural areas, coastland, natural forest, planted forests, riparian zones, scrub and shrublands, urban areas, and wetlands.

Feeding 

The giant African snail is a macrophytophagous herbivore; it eats a wide range of plant material, fruit, vegetables, lichens, fungi, paper, and cardboard. It sometimes eats sand, very small stones, bones from carcasses, and even concrete as calcium sources for its shell. In rare instances, the snails consume each other, snail eggs, and other deceased small animals such as mice and birds.

In captivity, this species can be fed on a wide range of fruit and vegetables, plain unseasoned mince, or boiled egg. They should always be provided with a source of calcium carbonate such as cuttlefish bone, vital for healthy shell growth. They require about 20% of crude protein in their diet for optimal growth.

Lifecycle 
This species is a simultaneous hermaphrodite; each individual has both testes and ovaries and is capable of producing both sperm and ova. The testes typically mature first around 5–8 months, followed by the ovaries. Self-fertilization is not viable and therefore snails require a partner to reproduce. Snails typically mate with a snail of similar size. During the mating, the snails either simultaneously transfer gametes to each other (bilateral sperm transfer), or one snail transfers sperm into the other (unilateral sperm transfer).

Snails mate at night and their mating begins with courtship rituals that can last up to half an hour, including petting their heads and front parts against each other. One snail initiates the courtship, and if all goes well they begin copulation. However, copulation does not always occur because snails show mate choice behavior, and observations have shown up to 90% of attempted courtships were rejected and did not end in copulation. Copulation can last anywhere from 1–24 hours, but tends to last 6–8 hours. Transferred sperm can be stored within the body up to two years.

The snails are oviparous and lay shelled eggs. The number of eggs per clutch and clutches per year varies by environment and age of the parent, but averages around 200 eggs per clutch and 5-6 clutches per year. The eggs hatch after 8-21 days and the snails emerge as juveniles. They reach adult size in about six months, after which growth slows, but does not cease until death. Life expectancy is 3–5 years in the wild and 5–6 years in captivity, but the snails can live for up to 10 years.

Snails are primarily active at night and spend their days in dark, damp places such as buried in soil or under leaf litter. They are capable of aestivating up to three years in times of extreme drought, sealing itself into its shell by secretion of a calcareous compound that dries on contact with the air.

Parasites 

Several different species and types of parasites have been known to infect Lissachatina fulica.

 Aelurostrongylus abstrusus, also known as "feline lungworm", is a nematode that infects cats.
 Angiostrongylus cantonensis, also known as "rat lungworm", is a nematode that causes eosinophilic meningoencephalitis. Infected snails have been found in South American countries including Peru, Ecuador, Venezuela, and Brazil. Human cases of this meningitis usually result from a person having eaten the raw or undercooked snail, but even handling live wild snails of this species can infect a person with the nematode, thus causing a life-threatening infection.
 Angiostrongylus costaricensis  is a nematode that causes abdominal angiostrongyliasis.
Fasciola gigantica is a flatworm that has been detected in the faeces and intestines of the snail.
Hymenolepis is a tapeworm that has been detected in the faeces of the snail.
 Schistosoma mansoni  is a parasitic flatworm that causes intestinal schistosomiasis. Sporocysts of S. mansoni have been detected in snail faeces
 Strongyloides species, including Strongyloides stercoralis, are roundworms that have been detected in faeces and in mucous secretion of the snail.
Trichuris is a roundworm that has been detected in the faeces of the snail.

As an invasive species 
In many places, this snail is a pest of agriculture and households, with the ability to transmit both human and plant pathogens.  Suggested preventive measures include strict quarantine to prevent introduction and further spread. This snail has been given top national quarantine significance in the United States. In the past, quarantine officials have been able to successfully intercept and eradicate incipient invasions on the mainland USA.

They are also known to damage buildings by eating stucco and similar materials for the calcium.

In the wild, this species often harbors the parasitic nematode Angiostrongylus cantonensis, which can cause a very serious meningitis in humans. Human cases of this meningitis usually result from a person having eaten the raw or undercooked snail, but even handling live wild snails of this species can infect a person with the nematode, thus causing a life-threatening infection.

In some regions, an effort has been made to promote use of the giant African snail as a food resource to reduce its populations. However, promoting a pest in this way is a controversial measure, because it may encourage the further deliberate spread of the snails.

One particularly catastrophic attempt to biologically control this species occurred on South Pacific Islands. Colonies of A. fulica were introduced as a food reserve for the American military during World War II and they escaped. A carnivorous species (Florida rosy wolfsnail, Euglandina rosea) was later introduced by the United States government, in an attempt to control A. fulica, but the rosy wolf snail instead heavily preyed upon the native Partula snails, causing the extinction of most Partula species within a decade.

Human use 

These snails are used by some practitioners of Candomblé for religious purposes in Brazil as an offering to the deity Oxalá. The snails substitute for a closely related species, the West African giant snail (Archachatina marginata) normally offered in Nigeria. The two species are similar enough in appearance to satisfy religious authorities. They are also edible if cooked properly. In Taiwan, this species is used in the dish of 炒螺肉 (fried snail meat), which is a delicacy among the traditional drinking snacks. L. fulica also constitutes the predominant land snail found in Chinese markets, and larger species have potential as small, efficient livestock.

The snails have also become increasingly popular as pets in countries including France and the UK, where various companies have sold the animal both as a pet and an education aide. 

The heparinoid, acharan sulfate, is isolated from this species.

References 
This article incorporates CC BY-2.0 text from the reference.

External links
 Fontanilla I.K.C. (2010). Achatina (Lissachatina) fulica Bowdich: its molecular phylogeny, genetic variation in global populations, and its possible role in the spread of the rat lungworm Angiostrongylus cantonensis (Chen). PhD thesis, University of Nottingham. 634 pp

 New Pest Response Guidelines for Achatina fulica, United States Department of Agriculture 
 Global Invasive Species Database
 Achatina fulica references from the Hawaiian Ecosystems at Risk project (HEAR)
 Species Profile- Giant African Snail (Achatina fulica), National Invasive Species Information Center, United States National Agricultural Library. Lists general information and resources for Giant African Snail.
 Mead, Albert R. 1961. The Giant African Snail: A Problem in Economic Malacology. Univ. Chicago Press, 257 pp.
 

Achatinidae
Gastropods described in 1821